Lawrence Shankland (born 10 August 1995) is a Scottish professional footballer who plays as a striker for Scottish Premiership club Heart of Midlothian and the Scotland national team.

Shankland began his career at Queen's Park before moving to Aberdeen in 2013. He played on loan with Dunfermline Athletic, St Mirren and Greenock Morton before joining Ayr United in 2017. He signed for Dundee United in 2019 and made his debut for Scotland later that year. In 2021 Shankland moved to Belgian club Beerschot, but after one year in Belgium he returned to Scotland with Heart of Midlothian.

Club career

Queen's Park
Shankland was born in Glasgow and attended Bannerman High School in Baillieston. He progressed through the Queen's Park youth system and was their top goalscorer in the 2012–13 season, having moved to the senior squad straight from the under-17 team; he also worked part-time as a tool setter in a local plumbing supplies company, a position arranged by the amateur club to help their young players earn a wage. He scored his first senior goal on 4 August 2012, aged 16, in a Scottish League Cup tie against Airdrieonians.

Shankland signed for Aberdeen at the end of the season. He was one of three Queen's Park players to move to top flight Scottish clubs at that time, as Andy Robertson and Aidan Connolly signed for Dundee United. Blair Spittal also made the move to Dundee United a year later.

Aberdeen
Shankland was initially placed in the Aberdeen under-20 squad, as he adjusted to full-time professional training. He made his debut appearance for Aberdeen in September 2014, in a 3–2 victory against Inverness CT. After impressing in the under-20s, scoring plenty of goals, and making first team appearances as a substitute, Shankland signed a new contract to run until summer 2017; however, he was loaned to lower-division clubs for the vast majority of its duration. At the end of the 2016–17 season, Aberdeen confirmed that Shankland would be leaving the club.

Dunfermline loan
He moved to Dunfermline Athletic on loan for the latter part of the 2013–14 season. The 18-year-old striker scored seven league goals during his short spell in Fife; however, injury prevented him taking part in the Pars end-of-season promotion play-off with local rivals Cowdenbeath which ended in defeat.

St Mirren and Morton loans
Shankland was loaned to St Mirren in August 2015 for the rest of the 2015–16 season. He scored his first goal for the Buddies in a 2–1 home defeat to Raith Rovers on 18 September 2015. Shankland scored 10 goals in 32 appearances during his loan spell, and returned to Aberdeen at the end of the season.

In July 2016 it was confirmed that Shankland had returned to St Mirren, on a season-long loan. However, having failed to score any league goals in the first half of the season, his St Mirren deal was cut short and on 11 January 2017, he moved on loan to their rivals, fellow Scottish Championship side Greenock Morton. After helping the club to a 4th-place finish, his final appearance for Morton was in the Scottish Premiership playoff defeat to Dundee United.

Ayr United
In September 2017, free agent Shankland signed a short-term contract to play for Scottish League One club Ayr United until the following January. On 24 March 2018 he scored a hat-trick against former club Queen's Park. Ayr won the league by one point, and after finishing with 29 goals, Shankland was named as the division's PFA Scotland Players' Player of the Year.

He started the 2018–19 season with a hat-trick against former club Morton in the League Cup. On 28 July, he scored a "stunning goal" from 45 yards as Ayr defeated Partick Thistle to qualify for the knockout stage of the competition. With a goal against Dunfermline on 25 August 2018, Shankland moved to 41 goals in 42 games for the Honest Men.

In November 2018, he scored four goals in a league fixture away to Dundee United which ended 5–0 and put Ayr five points clear at the top of the table. However he then sustained an injury, and Ayr's form deteriorated in his absence. He returned towards the end of the season, but the team's campaign ended with defeat to Inverness CT in the opening round of the Premiership promotion play-offs, having finished in 4th position. Shankland, whose total return was 34 goals in 41 games, was nominated for the division's PFA Player of the Year Award, but lost out to another prolific striker, Stephen Dobbie. Both were named in the Team of the Year.

Dundee United
On 3 July 2019 it was announced that Shankland had left Ayr to join fellow Championship side Dundee United on a three-year contract, turning down offers from other clubs in both England and Scotland. He scored on his debut for the club in a Scottish League Cup tie against Hearts on 12 July 2019, and scored four goals in a 4–1 victory against Inverness Caledonian Thistle on the opening day of the 2019–20 Scottish Championship season. Shankland was named Scottish Championship Player of the Month for August 2019, having scored eight goals in four appearances during the month. The season was suspended in March 2020 due to the COVID-19 pandemic in Scotland, and curtailed a month later, with Dundee United declared winners and promoted; up to that point Shankland had scored 24 league goals to finish as the division's top scorer, and maintained the  ratio of almost a goal-per-game he had set at Ayr, with a total of 28 from 33 appearances.

Beerschot

On 11 August 2021, Shankland moved to Belgian side Beerschot for an undisclosed fee. Shankland scored five league goals for Beerschot during the 2021–22 season as they were relegated from the Belgian top division.

Heart of Midlothian
Shankland returned to Scottish football in July 2022, signing a three-year contract with Heart of Midlothian.

He scored his first goal for Hearts in a 1-1 draw with Hibernian at Easter Road on 7 August 2022

Shankland became the first Hearts' player since John Robertson in the 1991-92 season to score 20 goals in all competitions following his goal in the Scottish Cup against Hibs to make it 2-0.

International career
Shankland represented Scotland under-18s in Victory Shield matches against the other home nations in 2012. He was first selected for the Scotland national under-21 football team in March 2015; he made his debut away to Hungary, scoring two late goals in a 2–1 victory. He made three other under-21 appearances, also in 2015, producing one draw and two defeats.

On 1 October 2019, Scotland manager Steve Clarke called up Shankland to the senior squad for the first time. He won his first cap when he came on as a second-half substitute in the side's 4–0 defeat by Russia on 10 October (playing alongside national team captain Andy Robertson for the first time since their time at Queen's Park in the fourth tier of Scottish football, nearly seven years earlier) and three days later made his first start and scored his first goal, the fourth in a 6–0 victory over San Marino at Hampden Park.

Career statistics
Club

International

Scores and results list Scotland's goal tally first.

HonoursAyr UnitedScottish League One: 2017–18Dundee UnitedScottish Championship: 2019–20Individual'''
PFA Scotland Players' Player of the Year (League One): 2017–18
Scottish League One Player of the Month: November 2017, March 2018
Scottish Championship Player of the Month: August 2018, August 2019

References

External links

Profile and stats at AFC Heritage Trust''

1995 births
Living people
Footballers from Glasgow
People from Baillieston
Scottish footballers
Scotland youth international footballers
Scotland under-21 international footballers
Scotland international footballers
Association football forwards
Queen's Park F.C. players
Aberdeen F.C. players
Dunfermline Athletic F.C. players
St Mirren F.C. players
Greenock Morton F.C. players
Ayr United F.C. players
Dundee United F.C. players
Scottish Football League players
Scottish Professional Football League players
Scottish expatriate footballers
Expatriate footballers in Belgium
Scottish expatriate sportspeople in Belgium
K Beerschot VA players
Belgian Pro League players
Heart of Midlothian F.C. players